Shinobu Sato (born June 5, 1955), is a Japanese classical artist. Shinobu debuted in 1988 with the tape Red Dragonfly: World Music on Guitar, which was released on audio CD in 1992. His second major album, Little Signs of Autumn was released on audio CD in 1994.

Biography

Early life
Shinobu was born in Kobe, Japan, and began playing the acoustic guitar at the age of 13. He emigrated to the United States in 1979 after meeting his future wife Katherine Larson. He has the ability to play the guitar either left- or right-handed.

Early career
Shinobu began working in Los Angeles, California as a waiter, while trying to establish his career as a musician. He received his economics degree in Japan and his masters in Music History and Guitar from Northeastern Illinois University.

Current work
Shinobu teaches guitar to students of all ages throughout the northside of Chicago, Illinois.

Personal life 
Shinobu is father to -year-old Ian Junpei Sato, -year-old Colin Makito Sato, and -year-old Maya Hikari Sato. He married Katherine Larson, an associate professor in the English Language Academy at the DePaul University, in 1983.

Discography
1988: Red Dragonfly: World Music on Guitar
1992: On This Day Earth Shall Ring: Songs for Christmas
1994: Little Signs of Autumn

References 

1955 births
Living people
Japanese classical guitarists
Northeastern Illinois University alumni
Waterbug Records artists
Flying Fish Records artists